The men's 54 kg competition in taekwondo at the 2021 Islamic Solidarity Games will held on 9 August at the Selcuk University 19 Mayis Sport Hall in Konya.

Results 
 Legend
 PTG — Won by Points Gap
 SUP — Won by superiority
 OT — Won on over time (Golden Point)
 DQ — Won by disqualification
 PUN — Won by punitive declaration
 WD — Won by withdrawal

Main Bracket

References

M54